Teamwork is a public sculpture by Omri Amrany located at American Family Field west of downtown Milwaukee, Wisconsin. Teamwork is cast in bronze and honors Jeffrey Wischer, William DeGrave, and Jerome Starr, the three Iron Workers Local 8 members killed by the Big Blue Crane collapse during the construction of the new baseball stadium. The sculpture was commissioned by the Habush, Habush and Rottier Charitable Foundation for $250,000.

Description
Teamwork depicts three Milwaukee Local Union 8 Ironworkers dressed for construction work. All wear jeans, t-shirts, boots and hardhats. One holds a clipboard.

Information
The sculpture honors William DeGrave, Jerome Starr and Jeffrey Wischer, three ironworkers who were killed by a piece of the stadium's retractable roof that fell when a crane failed during the construction of Miller Park. The widows of the workers, Marjorie DeGrave, Ramona Dulde-Starr and Patricia Wischer, settled a lawsuit against crane-maker Mitsubishi Heavy Industries of America, for an undisclosed total of over $99 million. Attorney Robert L. Habush represented two of the widows in their suit.

References

2001 establishments in Wisconsin
2001 sculptures
Bronze sculptures in Wisconsin
Monuments and memorials in Wisconsin
Outdoor sculptures in Milwaukee
Sculptures of men in Wisconsin
Statues in Wisconsin